The 2012 United States presidential election in Nebraska took place on November 6, 2012, as part of the 2012 United States presidential election in which all 50 states plus the District of Columbia participated. Voters chose five electors to represent them in the Electoral College via a popular vote pitting incumbent Democratic President Barack Obama and his running mate, Vice President Joe Biden, against Republican challenger and former Massachusetts Governor Mitt Romney and his running mate, Congressman Paul Ryan.

Mitt Romney carried Nebraska, taking 59.80% of the vote to Barack Obama's 38.03%, a margin of 21.77%. Nebraska is one of two states (along with Maine) which splits its electoral votes based on the winner in each congressional district. In 2012, Romney won all 3 congressional districts, thus winning all 5 of the state's electoral votes. This was a change from 2008, when the state as a whole had voted for Republican John McCain but Democrat Barack Obama still won an electoral vote from the state. Nebraska's 2nd congressional district, home to Omaha, had split with the rest of the state and awarded one of Nebraska's electoral votes to a Democratic presidential nominee for the first time since 1964. Nebraska's 2nd congressional district, Indiana, and North Carolina were the only sources of electoral votes won by Obama in 2008 that Romney managed to flip. Obama only won a single county, Thurston, largely due to its majority and increasingly politically active Native American population. He also narrowly lost three of four counties he won in 2008: Douglas, Lancaster, and Saline, home to the cities of Omaha, Lincoln, and Crete, respectively.

This is the most recent election as of 2020 in which the Democrat won Thurston County and the Republican won Douglas or Lancaster County. This is also the last election (and the sole one since 2000) when both Nebraska's 2nd congressional district did not back the overall winner of the Electoral College, while the Democratic candidate would win the general election without carrying the district (which was the first time that scenario would occur since 1996) as well.

Primaries

Democratic
The Democratic primary was not held as Barack Obama ran unopposed and had secured enough delegates for nomination.

Republican

The Republican primary was on May 15, 2012. This primary was purely of an advisory nature. From June 1 to June 10 caucuses county conventions caucused to elect delegates to the state convention. These delegates were not bound to vote for any candidate, but at the state convention on July 14, elected 32 bound National delegates. 3 party leaders attended the National Convention unbound, making a total of 35 voting delegates going to the national convention from Nebraska.

Convention
The State Convention was held in Grand Island on July 14, 2012.

General election

Results

By county

Counties that flipped from Democratic to Republican
 Douglas (largest city: Omaha)
 Lancaster (largest city: Lincoln)
 Saline (largest city: Crete)

Results by congressional district
Romney won all three of Nebraska's congressional districts.

See also
 United States presidential elections in Nebraska
 2012 Republican Party presidential debates and forums
 2012 Republican Party presidential primaries
 Results of the 2012 Republican Party presidential primaries
 Nebraska Republican Party

References

External links
The Green Papers: for Nebraska
The Green Papers: Major state elections in chronological order

Nebraska
United States president
2012